The Premier League is an association football competition which forms the top level of the English football league system.  It was founded in 1992, and in that time, only six goalkeepers have scored a goal in the competition. In 2001, Peter Schmeichel was the first goalkeeper to score in the Premier League, and the most recent goalkeeper to do so was Alisson in 2021.

Goal summaries

In 2001, Peter Schmeichel became the first goalkeeper to score in the Premier League. Schmeichel scored a volley for Aston Villa from  out after coming up the field for a 90th minute corner. Schmeichel had previously scored in a UEFA Cup match for Manchester United against Rotor Volgograd, and had previously scored eight goals for Danish clubs Hvidovre and Brøndby. Brad Friedel was the second goalkeeper to achieve the feat in 2004, when he scored from short range in the aftermath of an 89th minute corner. His goal for Blackburn Rovers against Charlton Athletic made the score 2–2, though Charlton eventually won the match 3–2.

The fourth and fifth goals were both from clearances from within the goalkeepers' own penalty areas and were assisted by the wind. They were scored by Tim Howard and Asmir Begović, in 2012 and 2013 respectively. In 2014, Guinness World Records acknowledged Begović's goal as the "longest goal scored in football", and it stayed as the record until it was beaten by Newport County goalkeeper Tom King in an EFL League Two match in 2021. Begović's goal was timed at 13 seconds from the start of the match. In May 2021, Liverpool goalkeeper Alisson scored a 95th-minute header to give his side the 2–1 victory against West Bromwich Albion. He was the first goalkeeper to score a headed goal in the Premier League, and the first goalkeeper to score in any official match for Liverpool. Alisson was also the first to score a winning goal.

List

Scores and results list the player's team is listed first.

See also
 List of goalscoring goalkeepers

References

Premier League goalscoring goalkeepers
Premier League goalscoring goalkeepers
Association football records and statistics
Association football player non-biographical articles